|}

This is a list of House of Assembly results for the 2006 South Australian state election.

Results by district

Adelaide

Ashford

Bragg

Bright

Chaffey

Cheltenham

Colton

Croydon

Davenport

Elder

Enfield

Finniss

Fisher

Flinders

Florey

Frome

Giles

Goyder

Hammond

Hartley

Heysen

Kaurna

Kavel

Lee

Light

Little Para

MacKillop

Mawson

Mitchell

Morialta

Morphett

Mount Gambier

Napier

Newland

Norwood

Playford

Port Adelaide

Ramsay

Reynell

Schubert

Stuart

Taylor

Torrens

Unley

Waite

West Torrens

Wright

See also
 Candidates of the 2006 South Australian state election
 Members of the South Australian House of Assembly, 2006–2010

References

2006
2006 elections in Australia
2000s in South Australia